The Chełm-Gdansk Cemetery is a  Jewish cemetery in Gdańsk (Danzig), with graves of the Jewish community of Danzig dating from the 1860s. The cemetery survived the Holocaust times in good condition. It was closed in 1956 and seriously devastated in the following years. It remains in dilapidated condition. The land has been reclaimed by the Jewish community, which has roots in the community going back to at least 1694. The International Jewish Cemetery Project of the International Association of Jewish Genealogical Societies is tracking its restoration.

References

External links
 Cmentarze żydowskie w Gdańsku
 Photographs of the Cemetery
 Photographs of the Cemetery
 Jewish Gdansk, including article on Chelm Cemetery

Jewish cemeteries in Poland
Jews and Judaism in Gdańsk

pl:Cmentarze żydowskie w Gdańsku